The Tukwila School, later known as Tukwila Town Hall and Tukwila Library, is a public building in Tukwila, Washington. Built in 1920, the former school was added to the National Register of Historic Places in 1979.

History 

Tukwila School is a single-story wood-frame building that contained two classrooms. Children in grades one through six attended the school until 1946. When the school was closed, the building was purchased by the city of Tukwila, which then used it as its Town Hall from 1947 to 1978. From 1980 to 2010, the building became the Tukwila Library. The Tukwila Historical Society leased the building in 2010 and renamed it the Tukwila Heritage and Cultural Center.

References

		
National Register of Historic Places in King County, Washington
School buildings completed in 1920
Defunct schools in Washington (state)